Dwayne Everett Anderson (born December 7, 1961) is a former American football defensive back who played for the St. Louis Cardinals of the National Football League (NFL) for one game in 1987. He played college football at Southern Methodist University. He played for the Tampa Bay Bandits of the United States Football League from 1984 to 1985. In 1985, he had four interceptions for 55 yards. Anderson had two of those interceptions in a 17–14 win versus the Birmingham Stallions on June 17 that clinched Tampa Bay's playoff berth.

References 

1961 births
Living people
American football defensive backs
SMU Mustangs football players
St. Louis Cardinals (football) players
Tampa Bay Bandits players
National Football League replacement players